Camille Sainte-Luce (born 18 April 1996) is a French athlete specialising in the hammer throw. She won a silver medal at the 2017 European U23 Championships and bronze at the 2018 Mediterranean Games.

Her personal best in the event is 69.90 metres set in Tarragona in 2018.

International competitions

References

External links 
 
 
 
 

1996 births
Living people
French female hammer throwers
People from Le Blanc-Mesnil
Sportspeople from Seine-Saint-Denis
Mediterranean Games bronze medalists for France
Mediterranean Games medalists in athletics
Athletes (track and field) at the 2018 Mediterranean Games
21st-century French women